SS Morro Castle may refer to:

  A ship launched by the Ward Line and scrapped in 1926.
  A ship burned in 1934. Also owned by the Ward Line.

Ship names